Legacy is a 2000 American documentary film directed by Tod Lending. It was nominated for an Academy Award for Best Documentary Feature.

The film tracks three different generations (over five years) of a family in Chicago that lives in the Henry Horner Homes public housing. Their lives change, however, after a life-altering event - the murder of a family member - slowly changes them to have a more positive outlook on life.

Reception
Legacy has an approval rating of 80% on review aggregator website Rotten Tomatoes, based on 5 reviews, and an average rating of 7.60/10.

References

External links

Legacy at PBS
Legacy at Nomadic Pictures

2000 films
2000 documentary films
American documentary films
Documentary films about Chicago
Documentary films about families
Documentary films about African Americans
2000s English-language films
2000s American films